Bell River is a short river in Presque Isle County in the U.S. state of Michigan.

Bell River, along with the unnamed lake, nearly completely separates False Presque Isle from the rest of Presque Isle Township.

References 

Rivers of Michigan
Rivers of Presque Isle County, Michigan
Tributaries of Lake Huron